Hellstedt is a surname. Notable people with the surname include:

Folke Hellstedt (1891–1969), Swedish high jumper
Leone Hellstedt (1900–?), Canadian-Swedish pathologist and psychoanalyst

Swedish-language surnames